Khola Gaon is a medium-sized village in Chhatak Upazila, in the district of Sunamganj in the division of Sylhet, Bangladesh.

Geography
The organic village lies on both sides of the River Dahuka, which is a tributary of the River Surma. The river is the livelihood of the people of the village as it is used for transport, irrigation and other daily uses. The southern half of the village has a two-storey mosque and a playing field along with most of the inhabitants of the village residing there, whereas the northern parts consists of newer houses and is connected to the outside world not only by river, but a road which is still in the process of being updated. The road connects the village with the local bazaar of Govindaganj, and from there, you are able to travel anywhere in Bangladesh. Adjacent to Khola Gaon are the villages of Dosh Ghor (north-side), Binodpur, Borsal, Bangla Bazaar (east-side), Saila (south-side) and Bargoin (west-side). It is part of a union of villages called Saila-Afzalabad named after the much larger village of Saila.

Politics
Politics are not that important in this part of Chhatak, as people choose to live as a community. Everyone knows each other in this little village and most problems they come across get solved without the need of the government or an official getting involved. The main time an official is involved is over land disputes. Land disputes are a big issue around here as agriculture is the main source of income for people and there isn't enough of it.

Brief history
There is very little recorded history here, but if you go asking senior citizens of the village, you will get a much better picture. The first people of this village are the Talukhdars who were land owners (zamidars) of that area during the British Raj. Every Talukhdar had companions who served the Talukhdars therefore, there were people such as fisherman, cleaners, etc. who also resided in the village at that time. After the collapse of the British Raj and the independence of Bangladesh, things had changed. The Talukhdars had lost most of their land to the local land grabbers and hence had lost their status as a zamidar. Since the independence, many locals have migrated to many different countries for employment, mainly to the United Kingdom. Money coming in from abroad has had an impact to the areas development and has added to the change of fortune for the people. It has also the left the area with a wider gap between the poor and the rich. Poverty and luxury are living side by side here.

Local Facilities
Primary Schools: Bargoin Primary (1 km) & Dosh Ghor Primary (1.5 km)
Secondary Schools: Bangla Bazaar High School (1 km)
Colleges: Moinpur College (8 km) & Govindaganj College (7 km)
Shopping Area (Bazaar): Dolarbazar (3.5 km) & Govindaganj (7 km)
Railway Station: Afzalabad Railway Station, near Govindaganj (7 km)
Police Station: Chhatak Police Station (10 km)
Towns: Chhatak (10 km), Jagannathpur (15 km), Bishwanath (13 km)
Cities: Sylhet (25 km), Sunamganj (35 km)
International Airport: Osmani International Airport, Sylhet (30 km)

See also
 Sylhet Division

Sunamganj District